Leon De La Mothe (December 26, 1880 – June 12, 1943) was an American film director, actor and screenwriter of the silent era. He directed 40 films between 1915 and 1925. He also appeared in 28 films between 1915 and 1928. He was born in New Orleans, Louisiana and died in Los Angeles, California.

Selected filmography
 The Magnificent Meddler (1917)
 By Right of Possession (1917)
 The Spotted Lily (1917)
 Heart of the Sunset (1918)
 Play Straight or Fight (1918)
 Her Moment (1918)
 Riddle Gawne (1918)
 The Red Glove (1919)
 Vanishing Trails (1920)
 Ten Scars Make a Man (1924)
 The Desert Hawk (1924)
 Pals (1925)
 Northern Code (1925)
 Ridin' Wild (1925)
 The Road Agent (1926)
 The Painted Trail (1928)
 Trail Riders (1928)
 Trailin' Back (1928)

External links

1880 births
1943 deaths
American film directors
American male film actors
American male silent film actors
American male screenwriters
Male actors from Louisiana
20th-century American male actors
20th-century American male writers
20th-century American screenwriters